Pene is a genus of air-breathing land snails, terrestrial pulmonate gastropod mollusks in the family Enidae.

Species
Species within the genus Pene include:
 Pene galilaea Heller, 1972

References

Enidae